Harry Dennison (4 November 1894 – 15 December 1947) was an English footballer who played as a forward for Blackburn Rovers, Rochdale, Wigan Borough and Stockport County.

Dennison made his debut for Blackburn Rovers (against Bristol City) on 8 April 1911, aged 16 years and 155 days old, making him the youngest person to play for the club.

References

1894 births
1947 deaths
English footballers
Footballers from Bradford
Association football forwards
Blackburn Rovers F.C. players
English Football League players
Rochdale A.F.C. players
Wigan Borough F.C. players
Stockport County F.C. players